Incurvaria triglavensis is a moth of the family Incurvariidae. It is found in Italy, Austria, Slovenia, Bosnia and Herzegovina and possibly a larger area of the Balkan Peninsula.

References

External links
Lepiforum.de

Moths described in 1912
Incurvariidae
Moths of Europe